Personal names in Bengali-speaking countries consist of one or several given names and a surname. The given is usually gender-specific. A name is usually cited in the "Western order" of "given name, surname", though the practise is neither adopted from the West nor it is universal. Personal names may depend generally on the person's religion and also have origins from other languages like Arabic, Persian, Sanskrit and Pali, but they are used and pronounced as according to the native Bengali language.

First names
Many people in Bangladesh and West Bengal have two given names: a "good name", which is used on all legal documents, and a "call name"  or "nickname", which is used by family members and close friends.

The two names may or may not be at all related; for example, a man named "Shumon" or "Sumon" or "Suman"  may be called by his Dak Nam (e.g. ) at home and by his Bhalo Nam elsewhere.

Many people also have a shortened version of their Bhalo Nam. For example, Dipu for Dipok, Faru for Farhana etc. in addition to their full Bhalo Nam and their Dak Nam.

Middle names

Though middle names are very common in Bangladesh, not every individual has one; this applies to West Bengal as well. Recently, many people have begun to add their dak nam to the middle or end of their full official name, resulting in names like "Saifuddin Kanchon Choudhuri", where "Saifuddin" would be the man's bhalo nam, "Kanchon" would be his dak nam and "Choudhuri" would be his family name. "Saifuddin Kanchon Choudhuri" could also be written as "Saifuddin Choudhuri Kanchon" dak nam in the end, depending on the choice of the person, how he/she displays their name. In these situations, this man would be correctly addressed "Mr. Choudhuri", not "Mr. Kanchon".

Family names

Bengali Muslim families mostly use names of Arabic origin, followed by Farsi and Bengali. Among Muslims of Bangladesh, there are several different naming conventions. There is no fixed scheme for the structure of names. Many people do not really use a family name, so members of a family can have different last names. The system of usage of different family names in the same family may also be followed by non-Muslims because of the dominating name style of not having same family names in a family by Muslims in Bangladesh. Bengali Hindu families use names of Sanskrit origin, followed by Bengali. They use many names which are listed below. Some of their names are somewhat shortened and altered, like Chatterjee, owing to British influence.

List of common family names by a person's religion

Muslim family names

Bengali Hindu family names

Initials and prefixes

Muhammad, Mohammed, Mohamed, Mohammad, Mohammod, Muhammod is a common prefix used before the name of many Muslim males, and it is often not considered as the name used to refer to the person. Other common prefixes are not systematic. The prefix often serves as the first name and the given name appears as the middle name or last name.

References

Bengali names
Bangladeshi
Bangladeshi culture
Indian culture